Thomas Leo Sweeney (c. 1929 – 17 February 2017) was a rugby union player who represented Australia.

Sweeney, a fullback, was born in Brisbane, Queensland and claimed 1 international rugby cap for Australia.

References

1920s births
2017 deaths
Australian rugby union players
Australia international rugby union players
Rugby union players from Brisbane
Rugby union fullbacks